Adam El Mihdawy (born August 9, 1989) is an American tennis player.

El Mihdawy has a career high ATP singles ranking of World No. 281 achieved on April 27, 2015. He also has a career high ATP doubles ranking of World No. 330 achieved on August 26, 2013.

At the height of his career, Adam was sponsored by Loriet Sports and coached by its founder and former Moroccan tennis player, Mehdy Karbid.

El Mihdawy made his ATP main draw debut at the 2008 Pilot Pen Tennis held on hard courts in New Haven, Connecticut when he was given a wild card direct entry into the doubles draw partnering Jesse Levine. The pair would go on to be defeated by Brazilian duo Marcelo Melo and Andre Sa.

El Mihdawy has reached 30 career singles finals, with a record of 14 wins and 16 losses all coming on the ITF Futures tour. Additionally, he has reached 23 career doubles finals with a record of 12 wins and 11 losses, which includes an 0–1 record in ATP Challenger Tour finals.

In 2022, El Mihdawy was fined $5,000 and banned from tennis for 3 and a half years after he admitted to fixing 2 matches in 2016.

ATP Challenger and ITF Futures finals

Singles: 30 (14–16)

Doubles: 23 (12–11)

References

External links
 
 

1989 births
Living people
American male tennis players
Match fixing in tennis
Match fixers